Jeanne Glynn  (1932 – June 8, 2007) was a writer. Jeanne Glynn died of cancer at age 75. Glynn was an actress who turned to writing. Her writing earned her five Daytime Emmy Award nominations. Glynn's nominations came for her work on General Hospital, Guiding Light, As the World Turns, One Life to Live and Port Charles. Other writing credits include Search for Tomorrow.

Glynn appeared in the 1957 TV version of Oedipus, The King which starred Christopher Plummer. The show was part of the Omnibus TV series. Plummer reprised his role in a 1967 feature film.

External links
Jeanne Glynn at boston.com
StarPulse
http://members.aol.com/blosslover/ceremony.html
The Christophers
CatholicNews
WGA-East

References

1932 births
2007 deaths
American soap opera writers
20th-century American women writers
Women soap opera writers
20th-century American screenwriters
21st-century American women